XEFB-TDT is a television station located in Monterrey, Nuevo León, Mexico. It is known as Televisa Monterrey and carries Televisa's local programs for Monterrey, including local news, sports and entertainment programming.

History
XEFB signed on in 1958 on channel 3. The station was the first local station in Monterrey (joining XHX-TV channel 10, its sister started in 1955) and boasted the first Ampex video tape equipment in Mexico. It converted to color in 1970.

The station moved to channel 2 in 1984 to allow XHWX, a new Imevisión station, to sign on the air.

In 2005, most of XEFB's local programming and focus moved to XHCNL channel 34. It returned in 2016 as part of XEFB's move to virtual channel 4, necessitated by the allocation of channel 2 to transmitters of Las Estrellas.

Digital television

On September 24, 2015, XEFB shut off its analog signal; its digital signal remained on channel 45. In 2018, XEFB moved from pre-transition UHF channel 45 to post-transition channel 15 in order to clear all broadcast stations out of the 600 MHz band.

Repeaters 
Three repeaters provide fill-in coverage in the Monterrey metropolitan area, while a fourth extends XEFB's coverage to include Saltillo, Coahuila:

|-

|-

|-

|}

When XHCNL was the primary local station for Televisa Monterrey, the XEFB repeater in Saltillo relayed its programming, not XEFB's.

References

External links
 Televisa Monterrey

Televisa Regional
Television stations in Monterrey
Spanish-language television stations in Mexico
Television channels and stations established in 1958
1958 establishments in Mexico